The 2020 Orlando Open was a professional tennis tournament played on hard courts. It was the second edition of the tournament which was part of the 2020 ATP Challenger Tour. It took place in Orlando, Florida, United States between 16 and 22 November 2020.

Singles main-draw entrants

Seeds

 1 Rankings are as of 9 November 2020.

Other entrants
The following players received wildcards into the singles main draw:
  Brandon Holt
  Patrick Kypson
  Sam Riffice

The following players received entry from the qualifying draw:
  Christian Harrison
  Stefan Kozlov
  Alexander Ritschard
  Zachary Svajda

The following players received entry as lucky losers:
  Nick Chappell
  Sadio Doumbia
  Kevin King

Champions

Singles

 Brandon Nakashima def.  Prajnesh Gunneswaran 6–3, 6–4.

Doubles

 Andrey Golubev /  Aleksandr Nedovyesov def.  Mitchell Krueger /  Jackson Withrow 7–5, 6–4.

References

2020 ATP Challenger Tour
2020 in American tennis
November 2020 sports events in the United States